"Crispin Glover" is the second single from Scarling.'s debut album, Sweet Heart Dealer. It was released in the USA on two separate 7" vinyl records on November 7, 2004 on the Sympathy for the Record Industry label. Each record has its own cover art — one a portrait of the song's titular actor, the other a photo of the band — and a unique b-side.

The title track on both discs has been remixed from the version of "Crispin Glover" on Sweet Heart Dealer.

Track listings and versions
 Digital Download
 "Crispin Glover" — 3:15
 "Art of Peetension" — 3:58
 "Love Becomes a Ghost" — 4:47

 SFTRI 738 (pink vinyl)
 "Crispin Glover"
 "Art of Peetension"

 SFTRI 739 (red vinyl)
 "Crispin Glover"
 "Love Becomes a Ghost"

Personnel
 Jessicka – vocals
 Christian Hejnal – guitar, vocals
 Rickey Lime – guitar
 Kyle Lime – bass
 Garey Snider – drums
 Chris Vrenna – producer
 Erik Colvin – mixing, producer

References

2004 singles
Scarling. songs
2004 songs
Sympathy for the Record Industry singles